Neodorcadion is a genus of longhorn beetles of the subfamily Lamiinae, containing the following species:

 Neodorcadion bilineatum (Germar, 1824)
 Neodorcadion calabricum (Reitter, 1889)
 Neodorcadion exornatoides Breuning, 1962
 Neodorcadion exornatum (Frivaldsky, 1835)
 Neodorcadion fallax (Kraatz, 1873)
 Neodorcadion laqueatum (Waltl, 1838)
 Neodorcadion orientale Ganglbauer, 1883
 Neodorcadion pelleti (Mulsant & Rey, 1863)
 Neodorcadion virleti (Brullé, 1833)

References

Dorcadiini